Ponapea is a genus of palms which is native to certain islands in the western Pacific.  The genus consists of four species, and has often been considered to be part of the genus Ptychosperma. Three of the species are endemic to the Caroline Islands, the fourth to the Bismarck Archipelago.

 Ponapea hentyi (Essig) C.Lewis & Zona - New Britain
 Ponapea hosinoi Kaneh. - Pohnpei
 Ponapea ledermanniana Becc. - Caroline Islands
 Ponapea palauensis Kaneh. - Palau

References

Arecaceae genera
Flora of Micronesia
Flora of Papuasia
Taxa named by Odoardo Beccari
Ptychospermatinae